Jae Head (born December 27, 1996) is an American actor. He is best known for portraying Sean Junior (S.J.) Tuohy, son of Sean and Leigh Anne Tuohy (played by Tim McGraw and Sandra Bullock), in the 2009 film The Blind Side, directed by John Lee Hancock.

Early life 
Head was born in Hamlin, Texas, in 1996. When he was born, he had no aorta, and blood vessels had to be adapted to temporarily replace the aorta. He had open-heart surgery at two months and again at 14 months. Over a three-year period, his pulmonary vein was converted into an aorta.

Career 
Head first gained popularity by playing Bo Miller, a young boy befriended by Tim Riggins on the television series Friday Night Lights. Subsequently, show creator Peter Berg cast Head in his film Hancock alongside Will Smith, Charlize Theron, and Jason Bateman. Head has also appeared in episodes of the CBS sitcom How I Met Your Mother, MADtv, and Law & Order: Special Victims Unit.

Filmography

Film

Television

Awards and nominations

References

External links

American male child actors
American male film actors
Living people
1996 births
Male actors from Texas
People from Hamlin, Texas